A list films produced in Pakistan in 1998 (see 1998 in film) and in the Urdu language:

1998

See also
1998 in Pakistan

External links
 Search Pakistani film - IMDB.com

1998
Pakistani
Films